Devork Lake is a lake in the east part of Thunder Bay District in northwestern Ontario, Canada. The lake drains via the Kagiano and the Pic River to Lake Superior.

References

Other map sources:

Lakes of Thunder Bay District